Martin Olof Lorentzson (born 21 July 1984) is a Swedish former professional footballer who played as a right-back. He earned one international cap for Sweden.

Career
Lorentzson started his professional football career in Norrköping with IK Sleipner. In 2007, he left Sleipner and joined Södertälje side Assyriska Föreningen.

In the summer of 2009, AIK, Swedish champions of 2009, announced that Lorentzson would join them in 2010. He enjoyed a successful career at AIK and was fan favourite known as 'Lorenzo' and 'The Swedish Zanetti'. He was also vice captain in his final season. In October 2014 AIK announced that they were not extending Lorentzson's contract even though he himself wanted to stay.

Lorentzson made his debut for Coventry City on 30 January 2016 against Scunthorpe United at the Ricoh Arena. At the conclusion of the season, the Sky Blues announced that he would not be retained upon the conclusion of his contract.

Style of play
Lorentzson is known for his pace, stamina, crossing and aerial prowess from set pieces. [2] During match against Malmö in 2011 he broke the Allsvenskan's all-time record of kilometres covered in a game. In his earlier career whilst playing for Assyriska Föreningen he operated as a right-forward and right wing back and he has played in the centre back and defensive midfield positions for AIK. The latter being a position he expressed a desire to adapt his game to as he gets older.

Career statistics

References

External links
  
  
 

1984 births
Living people
People from Södertälje
Sportspeople from Stockholm County
Swedish footballers
Association football defenders
Sweden international footballers
Allsvenskan players
Superettan players
Ettan Fotboll players
Division 2 (Swedish football) players
English Football League players
AIK Fotboll players
Assyriska FF players
Åtvidabergs FF players
Coventry City F.C. players
Örebro SK players
Swedish expatriate footballers
Swedish expatriate sportspeople in England
Expatriate footballers in England